The women's 3000 metres event at the 2006 World Junior Championships in Athletics was held in Beijing, China, at Chaoyang Sports Centre on 19 August.

Medalists

Results

Final
19 August

Participation
According to an unofficial count, 16 athletes from 11 countries participated in the event.

References

3000 metres
Long distance running at the World Athletics U20 Championships